Robert Charles Brack (born March 2, 1953) is a senior United States district judge of the United States District Court for the District of New Mexico.

Education and career

Born in Lynwood, California, Brack received a Bachelor of Arts degree from Eastern New Mexico University in 1975 and a Juris Doctor from the University of New Mexico School of Law in 1978. He was in private practice in New Mexico from 1978 to 1997. He was a state district court judge in Clovis, New Mexico, from 1997 to 2003.

District court service

On April 28, 2003, Brack was nominated by President George W. Bush to a new seat on the United States District Court for the District of New Mexico created by 116 Stat. 1758. He was confirmed by the United States Senate on July 14, 2003, and received his commission on July 15, 2003. He assumed senior status on July 25, 2018.

Notable case

In July 2011, Columbus, New Mexico, dissolved its police force, due to a gun smuggling scandal that involved its village officials and others.  The Mayor, a village trustee, a former police chief, and nine other people were indicted in the scandal.  The case is being prosecuted by the United States Attorney from El Paso, Texas, but the case will be tried starting October 3, 2011 before Judge Brack in Las Cruces, New Mexico.

References

Sources

1953 births
Living people
Eastern New Mexico University alumni
Judges of the United States District Court for the District of New Mexico
New Mexico state court judges
People from Lynwood, California
United States district court judges appointed by George W. Bush
21st-century American judges
University of New Mexico School of Law alumni
People from Clovis, New Mexico